is a 1990 Japan-exclusive Sega Mega Drive video game about female professional wrestling. It features the famous female Japanese wrestler Cutie Suzuki.

As the first video game based on women's professional wrestling for the Sega Mega Drive, it played a pivotal role in establishing women as protagonists in 16-bit video games, predating Alisia Dragoon by two years.

Plot
Many girls in Japan have dreamt of fighting in a professional wrestling federation. All their training effort has helped them become glamorous professional wrestlers who dream of glory. Only nine girls have the "burning spirit" to fight for the five major titles of women's professional wrestling.

Gameplay
Punching is allowed in addition to traditional wrestling moves like the piledriver and the suplex. There is even a spectator mode that allows players to preview each fighter's moves.

Damage is displayed for each fighter by the facial expressions of the character. Players can continue to lose matches without the threat of a game over screen. Each wrestler recovers stamina at a different rate. They also have different ways of expressing physical pain and they have different types of screams when they are in anguish.

References

External links

1990 video games
Asmik Ace Entertainment games
Copya Systems games
Fighting games
Japan-exclusive video games
Sega Genesis games
Sega Genesis-only games
Video games developed in Japan
Video games scored by Akihiko Mori
Video games featuring female protagonists

Professional wrestling games
Multiplayer and single-player video games